"INVU" is a song recorded by South Korean singer Taeyeon for her third studio album of the same name. It was released as the lead single by SM Entertainment on February 14, 2022. "INVU" was written by Jinli (Full8loom), composed by Peter Wallevik, Daniel Davidsen, Rachel Furner, and Jess Morgan, and arranged by PhD.

Background and release
On January 11, 2022, SM Entertainment announced that Taeyeon would release a digital single titled "Can't Control Myself" on January 17 prior to the release of her third studio album in February 2022. On January 26, the name of the third studio album was announced as INVU, for release on February 14 and consisting of thirteen tracks, with pre-orders starting on the same day. On February 3, the mood sampler video was released with "INVU" announced as the lead single. On February 12, the music video teaser was released. On February 14, the song was released as the lead single of INVU, alongside the music video.

During the press conference for INVU held on February 14, the singer stated that there was "pushback" against choosing the song as the lead single, as her team "was saying 'No' and [she] was the only one who was saying 'Yes!'". She called it "a bold decision, but [she] had confidence" that it was the best choice. On February 15, in an interview with Nylon via email, Taeyeon said that she was "immediately drawn to this type of genre" upon hearing the song. The singer also revealed "INVU" as her favorite song off the album and added that "The way I approach love is similar to how ["INVU"] describes it, so I feel a little more attached to it".

On April 28, the three remixes of "INVU" by Zhu, Moon Kyoo, and Ginjo, titled iScreaM Vol.15: INVU Remixes, was released.

Composition

"INVU" was written by Jinli (Full8loom), composed by Peter Wallevik, Daniel Davidsen, Rachel Furner, and Jess Morgan, and arranged by PhD. Musically, the song was described as a house, dance-pop, and synth-pop song with a "funky beat", "soft and dreamy synth sound", "impressive flute melody in the chorus", "vocals that deeply express the various emotions contained in the song", and "splendid high notes [that] emphasize the lyrics". The song features "melancholy lyrics by saying 'I envy you' towards a partner who does not take love seriously". "INVU" was composed in the key of B minor, with a tempo of 107 beats per minute.

Music video

The music video directed by Samson of High Quality Fish was released alongside the song by SM Entertainment on February 14. The "celestial"-themed music video portrays Taeyeon "as an enchanting warrior on a quest to annihilate the love that destroyed her" with scenes switching between "a marble-carved ancient Roman-inspired temple to a vast desert wasteland". She described the music video as "a new kind of image and visual that [she] hasn't tried before", stating that the song's concept "is about a main character who is hurt by love but nonetheless gives it all when it comes to love, and [she] wanted to express this through strong, warlike visuals in the music video", including various sets that "remind the viewers of Greek mythology".

The music video was chosen as one of the best K-pop videos of the year by Teen Vogue and Rolling Stone India.

Commercial performance
"INVU" debuted at number one on South Korea's Gaon Digital Chart in the chart issue dated February 13–19, 2022; on its component charts, the song debuted at number one on the Gaon Download Chart, number two on the Gaon Streaming Chart, and number eight on the Gaon BGM Chart. It ascended to number one on the Gaon Streaming Chart in the following week. On the Billboard K-pop Hot 100, the song debuted at number 15 in the chart issue dated February 26, 2022, ascending to number one in the following week. The song debuted at number seven on the Billboard South Korea Songs in the chart issue dated May 7, 2022.

In Singapore, the song debuted at number 29 on the RIAS Top Streaming Chart and number eight on the Top Regional Chart in the chart issue dated February 11–17, 2022, ascending to number 11 on the Top Streaming Chart and number four on the Top Regional Chart in the following week. The song also debuted at number 11 on the Billboard Singapore Songs in the chart issue dated March 5, 2022. On the Billboard Vietnam Hot 100, the song debuted at number  26 in the chart issue dated February 24, 2022, ascending to number 12 in the following week. In Taiwan, the song debuted at number 15 on the Taiwan Songs in the chart issue dated February 26, 2022, ascending to number eight in the following week. In Hong Kong, the song debuted at number 13 on the Billboard Hong Kong Songs in the chart issue dated March 5, 2022. In Malaysia, the song debuted at number 15 on the Billboard Malaysia Songs in the chart issue dated March 5, 2022.

In United States, the song debuted at number eight on the Billboard World Digital Song Sales in the chart issue dated February 26, 2022. Globally, the song debuted at number 138 on the Billboard Global Excl. U.S. in the chart issue dated March 5, 2022.

Promotion
Prior to the album's release, on February 14, 2022, Taeyeon held a live event called "Taeyeon INVU Countdown Live" on YouTube to introduce the album and communicate with her fans. Following the album release, she performed "INVU" on two music programs: Mnet's M Countdown on February 17, and SBS's Inkigayo on February 20.

Track listing
 Digital download / streaming – Original
 "INVU" – 3:24
 Digital download / streaming – Remixes
 "INVU" (Zhu remix) – 3:39
 "INVU" (Moon Kyoo remix) – 4:11
 "INVU" (Ginjo remix) – 3:40

Credits and personnel
Credits adapted from liner notes of INVU.

Studio
 SM Big Shot Studio – recording
 SM Starlight Studio – digital editing, engineered for mix
 SM Blue Cup Studio – mixing

Personnel
 SM Entertainment – executive producer
 Lee Soo-man – producer
 Yoo Young-jin – music and sound director
 Taeyeon – vocals, background vocals
 Rachel Furner – background vocals, composition
 Jinli (Full8loom) – lyrics
 Peter Wallevik – composition
 Daniel Davidsen – composition
 Jess Morgan – composition
 PhD – arrangement
 Lee Min-kyu – recording
 Jeong Yu-ra – digital editing, engineered for mix
 Lee Joo-hyung – vocal directing, Pro Tools
 Jeong Jeong-seok – mixing

Charts

Weekly charts

Monthly charts

Year-end chart

Accolades

Release history

See also
 List of Inkigayo Chart winners (2022)
 List of M Countdown Chart winners (2022)
 List of Show! Music Core Chart winners (2022)
 List of Gaon Digital Chart number ones of 2022
 List of K-pop Hot 100 number ones of 2022

Notes

References

Taeyeon songs
2022 songs
2022 singles
SM Entertainment singles
Korean-language songs
Dance-pop songs
South Korean synth-pop songs
House music songs
Billboard Korea K-Pop number-one singles
Gaon Digital Chart number-one singles
Songs written by Peter Wallevik
Songs written by Daniel Davidsen
Songs written by Tich (singer)